The 1832 United States presidential election in South Carolina took place between November 2 and December 5, 1832, as part of the 1832 United States presidential election. The state legislature chose 11 representatives, or electors to the Electoral College, who voted for President and Vice President.

South Carolina cast 11 electoral votes for the Nullifier Party candidate, John Floyd. These electors were elected by the South Carolina General Assembly, the state legislature, rather than by popular vote.

Results

References

South Carolina
1832
1832 South Carolina elections